Patrick Walsh (died 1578) was an Irish prelate who served as the Bishop of Waterford and Lismore from 1551 to 1578.

A graduate of Brasenose College, Oxford, he was appointed the Dean of Waterford on 9 March 1547. Four years later, Walsh was nominated the Bishop of Waterford and Lismore by Edward VI of England on 9 June 1551 and was consecrated by royal mandate on 23 October 1551. He retained the deanery of Waterford until he resigned it on 15 June 1566. After the accession of Queen Mary I, Walsh was recognized bishop by the Holy See in 1555/1556. But following the accession of Queen Elizabeth I, Walsh supported the crown's reformation legislation in the 1560 Irish Parliament.  In a letter of 12 October 1561, the papal legate Fr David Wolfe SJ described all the bishops in Munster as 'adherents of the Queen'.  Bishop Walsh was appointed to an ecclesiastical commission for enforcing the royal supremacy in June 1564. Described as a 'crypto-catholic' in 1577, Walsh had custody of the papal Bishop of Cork and Cloyne, Edmund Tanner, who described him as 'the heretical bishop of Waterford'; and persuaded him to make a 'strictly private' rejection of the Protestant faith.

Bishop Walsh died in 1578, and was described as a 'confirmed heretic' by the Franciscan Thomas Strange.

Notes

References

|-

Year of birth unknown
1578 deaths
16th-century Irish bishops
16th-century English bishops
Bishops of Waterford and Lismore (Church of Ireland)
Roman Catholic bishops of Waterford and Lismore
Alumni of Brasenose College, Oxford